Nathanael of Ohrid, Nathanael of Plovdiv or Nathanael of Zograf, born Nesho Stanov Boykikev; (Bulgarian/; 26 October 1820 – 18 September 1906) was a Bulgarian cleric, writer and revolutionary from Macedonia, one of the first supporters of literature in modern Bulgarian (as opposed to Church Slavonic) and one of the early figures of the Bulgarian National Revival.

Biography 
Nathanael was born as Nesho (Nedyalko) Stoianov (Stankov) Boykikev in the village of Kučevište, near Skopje, then Ottoman Empire. He studied at the Kučevište monastery, and in 1835 went to study in Samokov. Then he continued his education in Prilep, where along with teacher George Samurkashev translate in Bulgarian language the treatise "The Service of Jews and their evil", published in 1839 by Theodosius of Sinai.

In 1837 Boykikev become a monk in Zograf Monastery, named Nathanael. One year later he went to Chişinău, to study in the local theological school. He continued his education in the Theological Seminary in Odessa, Russia. In 1840-1841 he took part in translating of "Christian Mirror", printed in Moscow in 1847. He graduated from Kiev Theological Academy in 1851 with thesis on the medieval Bulgarian Orthodox Church history.

Nathanael published the book "A friendly letter by Bulgarian to Greek" in 1853 (Prague, Church Slavonic language). He was a ministry of Dobrovets Monastery in Moldova in 1854-1869. In 1863 along with Ivan Seliminski arhimandrit Nathanael was a Bulgarian delegate in Moravia in the celebration of 1000 years of work of Saints Cyril and Methodius.
Nathanael published in 1865 "Slav-Bulgarian primer" (Bucharest) and "Incident in Skopje Eparchy" (Brăila), which describes antigreek clerical and cultural movement of the Bulgarians in northern Macedonia.

Within the Bulgarian Exarchate, Nathanael was bishop in Ohrid in 1874-1880. He was also one of the leaders in the Kresna-Razlog Uprising. Nathanael was bishop of Lovech from 1880 to 1891, and from 1891 until his death was Metropolitan of Plovdiv.

Nathanael was a full member of the Bulgarian Learned Society (Bulgarian Academy of Sciences).

Enternal links 
 Writings (in Bulgarian)

Notes

Sources
 Енциклопедия "Българската възрожденска интелигенция. Учители, свещеници, монаси, висши духовници, художници, лекари, аптекари, писатели, издатели, книжари, търговци, военни..."(Съставители: проф. д-р Николай Генчев, Красимира Даскалова), С. 1988, с. 446-447
 Натанаил Охридски - Борба за България,   Веска Топалова, Издател:УИ "Св. Климент Охридски", 2003.

See also
Kresna-Razlog Uprising

1820 births
1906 deaths
19th-century Christian clergy
19th-century Bulgarian people
Bulgarian writers
Bulgarian revolutionaries
Bishops of the Bulgarian Orthodox Church
Members of the Bulgarian Academy of Sciences
Macedonian Bulgarians
Bulgarian expatriate bishops